New York's 111th State Assembly district is one of the 150 districts in the New York State Assembly. It has been represented by Angelo Santabarbara since 2013.

Geography
District 111 contains the entirety of Montgomery County, and portions of Schenectady and Albany counties.

Recent election results

2022

2020

2018

2016

2014

2012

References

111
Albany County, New York
Montgomery County, New York
Schenectady County, New York